Yakunina Gora is a rural locality (a village) in Sizemskoye Rural Settlement, Sheksninsky District, Vologda Oblast, Russia. The population was 13 as of 2002.

Geography 
Yakunina Gora is located 36 km north of Sheksna (the district's administrative centre) by road. Matveyevskoye is the nearest rural locality.

References 

Rural localities in Sheksninsky District